The Other Man is a 1916 short comedy film starring Fatty Arbuckle. The film was shot in Fort Lee, New Jersey.

Cast
 Roscoe 'Fatty' Arbuckle 
 Charles Avery
 Joe Bordeaux
 Minta Durfee
 Horace Haine
 William Jefferson
 Leatrice Joy
 Lillian Shaffner
 Al St. John
 Irene Wallace

See also
 Fatty Arbuckle filmography

References

External links

1916 films
1916 comedy films
1916 short films
American silent short films
American black-and-white films
Films directed by Mack Sennett
Films shot in Fort Lee, New Jersey
Silent American comedy films
American comedy short films
1910s American films